is an underground metro station located in Kōnan-ku, Yokohama, Kanagawa, Japan operated by the Yokohama Municipal Subway’s Blue Line (Line 1). It is 9.7 kilometers from the terminus of the Blue Line at Shōnandai Station.

History
Shimonagaya Station was opened on March 14, 1985. Platform screen doors were installed in September 2007.

Lines
Yokohama Municipal Subway
Blue Line

Station layout
Shimonagaya Station has a two opposed side platforms, located three stories underground.

Platforms

References
 Harris, Ken and Clarke, Jackie. Jane's World Railways 2008-2009. Jane's Information Group (2008).

External links
 Shimonagaya Station (Blue Line) 

Railway stations in Kanagawa Prefecture
Railway stations in Japan opened in 1985
Blue Line (Yokohama)